Bolshevik Nuclei (in French: Noyau-Bolshevik) was a small clandestine Marxist group in Senegal. It published Ferment. At the time of the 1988 elections it promoted abstention.

Sources
Zuccarelli, François. La vie politique sénégalaise (1940-1988). Paris: CHEAM, 1988.

Communist parties in Senegal
Defunct communist parties
Defunct political parties in Senegal
Political parties with year of establishment missing